Kimberly-Clark de México was founded in 1931 with the commercialization of Kotex in Mexico, currently the company is headquartered in Mexico City.

The company engages in the manufacture and commercialization of disposable products for daily use by consumers within and away-from home in Mexico and internationally. The company's products include diapers and childcare products, feminine pads, incontinence care products, bath tissue, napkins, facial tissue, hand and kitchen towels, wet wipes and health care products.

Today the company has 8 000 direct employees and over 10 thousand indirect jobs, driving a large number of chains that benefits thousands of Mexican families.

On October 22, 2019, the CEO announced that Kimberly-Clark de Mexico will no longer be making short-term investments in Mexico, due to differences with President Andrés Manuel López Obrador and a general slowdown in the economy. This was promptly followed by calls for a boycott of the company.

In July 2020 the FDA included a number of products by 4E Global, a subsidiary of Kimberly-Clark, on its "do-not-use" list of dangerous hand sanitizers due to possible methanol content.

References 

.
Manufacturing companies based in Mexico City
Manufacturing companies established in 1931
Companies listed on the Mexican Stock Exchange
Mexican subsidiaries of foreign companies
Mexican companies established in 1931